Conzattia is a genus of flowering plants in the legume family, Fabaceae. It belongs to the subfamily Caesalpinioideae.

The genus is native to Mexico, and includes trees and shrubs native to tropical and subtropical seasonally-dry forests, woodlands, and scrublands.

Conzattia multiflora is used for construction timber, fuel, and medicine across its native range. It is often found growing near ancient temples, which may be an indication of its use by indigenous peoples.

Species
Three species are recognized:
 Conzattia chiapensis Miranda – southeastern Mexico
 Conzattia multiflora (B.L.Rob.) Standl. – northwestern, northeastern, central, southwestern, and Gulf coastal Mexico.
 Conzattia sericea Standl. – northwestern Mexico

References

External links 
 

Caesalpinioideae
Fabaceae genera
Endemic flora of Mexico